Pataleeswarar Temple (பாடலீஸ்வரர் கோயில்) is a Hindu shrine dedicated to Shiva in the town of Thirupathiripuliyur, Cuddalore. It was constructed during the Pallava and Medieval Chola periods.

The Saivite saint Appar is believed to have adopted Saivism at this temple. It is one of the shrines of the 275 Paadal Petra Sthalams. There is a belief/myth that by worshiping this God a single time is equal to 16 times worshiping the Shiva in Kasi, eight times in Thiruvannamalai, and three times in Chidambaram.

Thirupathiripuliyur in Cuddalore is one of the ancient temples in Tamil Nadu. It is named after the Pathiri Tree and the Puliyur, a tiger-legged saint who obtained absolution in the area. The temple has a large temple car called Theeruvadaichan, a silver chariot and a golden chariot.

Nava Puliyur Temples
This is one of the Nava Puliyur Temples worshipped by Patanjali and Vyaghrapada. The following temples are called as Nava Puliyur Temples.

 Perumpatrapuliyur 
 Thirupathiripuliyur 
 Erukathampuliyur 
 Omampuliyur 
 Sirupuliyur  
 Atthippuliyur  
 Thaplampuliyur   
 Perumpuliyur 
 Kanattampuliyur

Architecture
The temple is constructed in Dravidian style of architecture. It is classified as Gnazhar Kovil, where the image of the presiding deity is set up under Gnazhar trees. Trees like Kondai, Kongu and Theekku (teak) all fall in the category. The temples constructed in wood made from Gnazhar trees are also classified as Gnzhar Koil. Literary evidence is found in the works of Tirugnanasambandar, who refers the temple as Gnazhar Koil.

Location
The temple is located in Thirupathiripuliyur in Cuddalore town. The temple is 0.5 km from Thirupathiripuliyur Railway Station. Padaleeswarar Temple is one of the ancient temples in Tamil Nadu. The temple plays a unique role in the history of Hindu religion, art, and architecture.

Religious significance
Appar's sister Thilakavathiyar was living in Thiruvathigai during her later years and devoted her lifetime service to Shiva. Afflicted by a painful illness, Thirunavukkarasar, who was originally called Dharmasenar and was then a staunch follower of Jainism, prayed for relief at this temple where his sister Thilagavathiyar served. By the divine grace of Shiva, he was cured. He embraced Saivism from then and started canonizing various temples with his verses. The ruling Pallava king namely Kadava punished Thirunavukarasar in various ways and finally dropped him in a lime kiln. He was subsequently cast on the waters of sea, where he started floating and was pushed ashore in Thirupathipuliyur. It is believed that some of his best songs were sung at this time in praise of the presiding deities at Padaleeswarar temple and Veerateneeswarar temple. Influenced by the greatness of the poet, the king himself converted from Jainism to Saivism.

References

External links 

 

Padal Petra Stalam
Shiva temples in Cuddalore district
Cuddalore